St. Peter is one of the four main churches of the old town of Zürich, Switzerland, besides Grossmünster, Fraumünster, and Predigerkirche.

History 
Located next to the Lindenhof hill, site of the former Roman castle, it was built on the site of a temple to Jupiter. An early church of 10 by 7 metres is archaeologically attested for the 8th or 9th century. This building was replaced by an early Romanesque church around AD 1000, in turn replaced in 1230 by a late romanesque structure, parts of which survive. Rudolf Brun, first independent mayor of the town, was buried here in 1360. The nave was rebuilt in 1460 in Gothic style. Prior to the Reformation, St. Peter was the only parish church of the town, the rest being part of monasteries. The first reformed pastor, Leo Jud (1523-1542), was a friend of Huldrych Zwingli and contributed to the first translation of the Bible in Zurich. Johann Kaspar Lavater was pastor from 1778 to 1801. His gravestone can be seen in the church wall. Theologian Adolf Keller served as pastor 1909 -1924.

The current building was consecrated in 1706 as the first church built under Protestant rule. Its congregation forms part of the Evangelical Reformed Church of the Canton of Zürich. Until 1911, the steeple was manned by a fire watch. Restoration work was carried out in 1970 to 1975. The steeple's clock face has a diameter of 8.7 m, the largest church clock face in Europe. The bells date to 1880.

Peculiarly, the church's steeple is owned by the city of Zürich, while the nave is owned by the St. Peter parish of the Evangelical Reformed Church of the Canton of Zürich.

Church tower and largest church clock of Europe 
The church tower and the nave of St. Peter do not have the same owner: Until the French Revolution the tower belonged to the former city republic of Zürich, since 1803 to the city of Zürich. Belfry and bells belong to the Reformed Church of the canton of Zürich, as well as the staircase leading to the tower.
 
The church tower was primarily used for fire police duties, and 1340 AD the first fire guard was set in duty. In the pre- and early Romanesque area, St. Peter had no church tower, i.e. the first massive three-storey tower was built in early 13th century AD. The first floor with Romanesque ribbed vault dates back to that period.

Towards the end of the 13th century a mechanical church clock was installed. In 1366 it was renewed and got one only dial that was directed towards the Limmat and only displayed the hours. Around 1460, the sense of time has been refined by half on the quarter-hour strike, and in 1538 the striking clock was replaced, and all four facades got dials. Replacements of the clock mechanism followed in 1593/94 and 1675 and 1826. In 1844 a new movement with quarter-hour strike was installed; the electrification of the work was carried out in 1873. In 1972 the balance was replaced by a fully automatic master clock in the clock room of the St. Peter's tower, and in 1996 the electrified mechanical movement of 1844 was shut down and replaced by a central computer system. The clock tower of St. Peter was for centuries Zürich's 'official local time', and all public city clocks had to conform to it. The church clock of St. Peter has the largest tower clock face in Europe, the outer diameter of each of the four church clocks measures , the minute hand , the hour hand , and the minute crack of the large pointer measures .

Pipe organ 
The pipe organ was installed in 1974 by Mühleisen Manufacture d´orgues from Strasbourg. It was revised in 1992, 1994 and 1997.

The slider chests instrument has 52 registers on three manuals and 32 pedals.

St. Peterhofstatt 
Around the 1st century BC La Tène culture, archaeologists excavated individual and aerial finds of the Celtic-Helvetii oppidum Lindenhof, whose remains were discovered in archaeological campaigns in the years 1989, 1997, 2004 and 2007 on Lindenhof, Münsterhof and Rennweg-Augustinergasse, and also in the 1900s, but the finds mistakenly were identified as Roman objects. Not yet archaeological proven but suggested by the historians, as well for the first construction of the today's Münsterbrücke Limmat crossing, the present Weinplatz square was the former civilian harbour of the Celtic-Roman Turicum.

Assumed to be the oldest parish church of Zürich, St. Peterhofstatt is St. Peter's adjoint plaza, analogously meaning the royal court at St. Peter.

Gallery

Literature
 Peter Ziegler: St. Peter in Zürich. Von den Ursprüngen bis zur heutigen Kirchgemeinde. Buchverlag NZZ, Zürich 2006

References

External links

Peterkirche
Peterkirche
Peterkirche
Zurich Peterkirche
18th-century architecture in Switzerland